The Bentley Film Festival, also known as The Bentley's, is a film festival held annually on December 3 in Kansas City, Missouri. The festival encourages short, uncut films to be shown as original productions.

History
The Bentley Film Festival first started on December 3, 1993, in Kansas City, Missouri.  It is a project that is funded by Independent Filmmaker's Coalition of Kansas City. The IFC requires contestants to use Super 8 mm film and Bentley Cameras (hence the name) so that everyone has an equal opportunity to show their work. The contestants are required to have a three-minute, unedited, and undeveloped film which incorporates original and creative work.

Film festivals in Missouri
Short film festivals in the United States
Tourist attractions in Kansas City, Missouri
Film festivals established in 1993